Ağzıbir was a village in the Kalbajar District of Azerbaijan.

References 

Populated places in Kalbajar District
Abolished villages in Kalbajar District